

Munda may refer to:

Places

India
 Munda, a village in Hanumangarh district, Rajasthan, India
 Munda Majra, a former village in Haryana, India
 Munda Pind, a village in Punjab, India

Pakistan
 Munda, a village near Bilyamin in Kurram Valley, Federally Administered Tribal Areas, Pakistan
 Munda, Lower Dir, a union council in Khyber Pakhtunkhwa province, Pakistan
 Munda Tehsil, an administrative subdivision of Khyber Pakhtunkhwa province, Pakistan

Other places
 Munda, the Latin name of the Mondego River, the largest river in present-day Portugal
 Munda, Solomon Islands, a settlement on the island of New Georgia in the Western Province of the Solomon Islands
 Mundabullangana, Western Australia, is commonly referred to as Munda.

Munda people
 Munda people, an ethnic group of the Chota Nagpur Plateau region of eastern India and parts of Bangladesh
 Munda peoples, list of peoples speaking Munda languages
 Munda languages, a language family spoken by about nine million people in eastern and central India
 Mundari language, a member of the Munda language family, spoken by the Munda people

Other uses
 Battle of Munda, took place on March 17, 45 BC in the plains of Munda, modern southern Spain
 Battle of Munda Point, a World War II battle
 Munda Dam, previous name of Mohmand Dam
 Munda (Hinduism), a monster that was killed by Chamunda Devi in Hinduism
 Munda, an early chieftain (reigned 1006–1026) of the Hoysala Empire, in modern Karnataka, India
 Munda (alga), a Eustigmatophyte, in Eustigmatales order
 Munda (insect), a genus of crickets, in the subfamily Podoscirtinae
 USS Munda, a US Navy escort aircraft carrier
 Turanga Munda, a fictional character in the animated TV series Futurama

See also
 Munda (surname)
 Munday (disambiguation)

Language and nationality disambiguation pages